Jack Clarkson (born 28 February 1935) is a former Australian rules footballer who played with Essendon in the Victorian Football League (VFL). He also played with Coburg in the Victorian Football Association (VFA).

Notes

External links 
		

Essendon Football Club past player profile

1935 births
Living people
Australian rules footballers from Victoria (Australia)
Essendon Football Club players
Coburg Football Club players